Krishnan Vinod Chandran is an Indian Judge. Presently, he is a Judge of Kerala High Court.

Career
Justice Vinod graduated in law from Kerala Law Academy Law College, Thiruvananthapuram and started his practice at Paravoor in the year 1991 and later extended to High Court of Kerala. During his practice he served as Special Government Pleader (Taxes) of the Government of Kerala from 2007 to 2011. He was elevated as an Additional Judge of Kerala High Court on 8 November 2011 and was made permanent on 24 June 2013.

References

External links
 High Court of Kerala

Living people
1963 births
Judges of the Kerala High Court
People from Ernakulam district
20th-century Indian judges